Kinnarathumbikal is a 2000 Indian low budget erotic film written, directed, and filmed by R. J. Prasad. It stars Shakeela in the lead role. The film was dubbed in more than six Indian languages. It was a major commercial success, grossing ₹4 crore at the box office against a budget of ₹12 lakh.

Plot
 The setting of the story is a cold hilly village in Kerala, rich with tea plantation. Gopu is a boy who stays with his aunt Janaki, who is a tea plantation worker and her daughter, Devu. Janaki's co worker, Dakshayani is the first contact neighbor of the family. Dakshayani, is in an open relationship with the supervisor of the plantation.

Janaki is looking for a suitable groom for Devu. However, Supervisor, who's interested in Devu, blocks the possible alliances for her. Dakshayani, being a woman with strong physical needs, tries to seduce Gopu yet, he escapes from her grasp. From Dakshayani, Gopu learns that since Devu is his aunt's daughter, there is a possibility of marrying her, even though Devu is older than Gopu. Gradually, Gopu's mind gets infatuated towards Devu. Soon Gopu realizes that Devu is interested in Gopu as well. Gopu and Devu finally find love. They roam as a couple in the landscapes of the village. When everything goes as planned, Janaki catches Gopu and Devu while making love. Janaki expels Gopu from her home.

Meanwhile, supervisor finds his own ways to abduct Devu and make her his wife. The supervisor is very adamant about marrying Devu. Gopu finds home in Dakshayani's house. Will Gopu reunite with the love of his life ? Will he meet his ambition of having Devu on his side? The movie ends with a bittersweet note.

Cast
 Shakeela as Dakshyani
 Hema as Devu
 Salim Kumar as tea shop owner
 Kalabhavan Shajohn as tea shop waiter
 Kuttyedathi Vilasini as Janaki
 Thodupuzha Vasanthi
 Vipin Roy as Gopu (dubbed by Jayan Cherthala)
 Sanju
 Kothiyan as Sanju's cousin

Soundtrack
The film features one song titled "Kinnaarathumbikal" composed by Mano Bhaskar, written by Sreekumaran Thampi and sung by K. S. Chithra.

Reception
The film was a major commercial success at the box office. Made on a budget of 12 lakh, the film grossed 4 crore at theatres. Its success triggered a series of similar low budget softporn films being produced in Malayalam cinema.

References

External links 
 

2000s Malayalam-language films
2000 films
2000s erotic films
Indian erotic films